Anansi Boys is an upcoming British fantasy television miniseries based on the novel of the same name by Neil Gaiman, which follows the two sons of the spider-god Anansi. The series is set to be released on Amazon Prime Video.

Cast
 Malachi Kirby as Charlie Nancy / Spider
 Delroy Lindo as Mr. Nancy
 Amarah-Jae St. Aubyn as Rosie Noah
 Grace Saif as Daisy Day
 CCH Pounder as Mrs. Higgler
 Fiona Shaw as Maeve Livingstone
 Jason Watkins as Grahame Coats
 L. Scott Caldwell as Mrs. Dunwiddy
 Joy Richardson as Mrs. Bustamonte
 Lachele Carl as Miss Noles
 Whoopi Goldberg as Bird Woman
 Hakeem Kae-Kazim as Tiger
 Emmanuel Ighodaro as Lion
 Cecilia Noble as Elephant
 Ayanna Witter-Johnson as Snake
 Don Gilet as Monkey
 Yvonne Mai as Kayla

Production

Development
In 2014, it was reported a BBC television miniseries of Anansi Boys was in the works. It would be made by Red Production Company with Gaiman as executive producer. The project did not come into fruition, and elements of it were instead incorporated into the Starz adaptation of American Gods.

In May 2020, it was reported that a miniseries adaptation was in development by Endor Productions for Amazon Prime Video. It is a standalone story and not a spin off of American Gods. In July 2021, it was announced Amazon had given the production a series order of 6 episodes. Amazon Studios, The Black Corporation, and Endor Productions are attached to the project; Red Production Company has on stayed to co-produce as well.

Gaiman and Douglas Mackinnon are the series' co-showrunners and executive producers. Gaiman is writing the series with Lenny Henry from the audio book, who is also executive producing. Arvind Ethan David, Kara Smith, and Racheal Ofori complete the writers' room. Other executive producers include Hanelle Culpepper, Hilary Bevan Jones of Endor, and Richard Fee of Red.

Casting
The same month as the greenlight, it was revealed Delroy Lindo would star as Mr. Nancy. In September, it was announced Malachi Kirby would star as both of Mr. Nancy's sons, Fat Charlie and Spider. Amarah-Jae St. Aubyn and Grace Saif were cast as the female leads Rosie Noah and Daisy Day respectively, as revealed in December. 

Casting additions in March 2022 saw Fiona Shaw, CCH Pounder, Jason Watkins, L. Scott Caldwell, Joy Richardson, and Lachele Carl round out the cast. In April 2022, it was announced Whoopi Goldberg, Hakeem Kae-Kazim, Emmanuel Ighodaro, Cecilia Noble, Ayanna Witter-Johnson and Don Gilet had also joined the cast.

Filming
Principal photography began on 18 November 2021 at First Stage Studios in Leith. The production received support from Screen Scotland. In June 2022, Gaiman shared an update on Twitter, confirming principal photography had wrapped at the end of May and informing fans that post-production would take time.

References

External links
 

Upcoming drama television series
English-language television shows
Amazon Prime Video original programming
2023 British television series debuts
2020s British drama television series
British fantasy television series
2020s British television miniseries
Television series based on mythology
Television shows filmed in Scotland
Television series based on works by Neil Gaiman
Television series by Amazon Studios
Television series by Red Production Company